Designated cultural assets of North Korea(Conservation-grade relics) are tangible artifacts, sites, and buildings deemed to have significant historical or artistic value. They are not, however, considered important enough to merit designation as a national treasure.

No. 1-100

No. 101-200

No. 201-300

No. 301-400

No. 401-500

No. 501-600

No. 701-800

801-900

No. 901-1000

No. 1101-1200

No. 1301-1400

No. 1501-1600

No. 1601-1700

No. 1701-1800

See also
 National Treasures of North Korea
 National treasures of South Korea
 Complex of Koguryo Tombs
 History of Korea
 Culture of Korea
 World Heritage sites in North Korea

Footnotes

References
 이계환: 북한 문화재 실태파악 시급하다, Tongilnews.com, 11 November 2005.

National Treasures of North Korea
Tourist attractions in North Korea
North Korea-related lists